A lean-to is a type of simple structure originally added to an existing building with the rafters "leaning" against another wall. Free-standing lean-to structures are generally used as shelters. One traditional type of lean-to is known by its Finnish name .

Lean-to buildings

A lean-to is originally defined as a building in which the rafters lean against another building or wall, a penthouse. These structures frequently have skillion roofs and as such are sometimes referred to as "skillions".

A lean-to shelter is a free-standing structure with only three walls and a single-pitched roof. The open side is commonly oriented away from the prevailing winds and rains. Often it is a rough structure made of logs or unfinished wood and used as a camping shelter.

A lean-to addition is a shed with a sloping roof and three walls that abuts the wall of another structure. This form of lean-to is generally provisional; it is an appendix to an existing building constructed to fulfill a new need. Sometimes, they cover external staircases, as is the case with the lean-to building built in the 15th century against one of the walls of the large chapter room of the cathedral of Meaux. Sometimes, they are built to protect entrances or to establish covered markets around certain large civic buildings.

Laavu 

 are commonly found in Finnish Lapland near popular fishing rivers and in national parks. Like wilderness huts, they are not heated, and may not be reserved beforehand. Unlike wilderness huts,  lack doors or windows. A typical  is a wooden hut, about 10 m2 in area and 2 m high, consisting of a roof, floor, and three walls. The fourth wall is left permanently open.

A  provides a safe place to sleep during fishing or hiking trips. Visitors are expected to bring their own sleeping bags, as the area has no other sleeping facilities. They are also commonly used as a rest stop along trails during daytime, and for camping cookout (which in Finland usually consists of grilling sausage on the campfire).

A  can also be an improvised structure of the same type, built out of available materials such as branches with leaves or pine/fir needles intact, or moss or animal pelts for the covering, and sturdier, stripped branches or young tree trunks as the supporting structure. These serve as temporary shelters deep in the wilderness, usually for a single overnight stay. This is the traditional meaning of the word. Traditionally, a log fire ( in Finnish,  in Swedish and Norwegian) was used, made so that it did not need surveillance during the night.

In the United States, this same type of structure is commonly referred to as an "Adirondack". Many youth camps use such structures to provide an inexpensive shelter for campers that is sturdier, and more durable, than a textile tent.

-like tents are also sold, meant for four or five people. Some of the modern nylon ones have a front flap that is pulled down for the night if there is no fire.

References

External links 

Huts
Camping
Log buildings and structures